Issatchenkia is a genus of fungi belonging to the family Pichiaceae.

The genus has cosmopolitan distribution.

Species:

Issatchenkia hanoiensis 
Issatchenkia orientalis

References

Saccharomycetes
Ascomycota genera